Enfield North is a peripheral Greater London constituency created in 1974 and represented in the House of Commons of the UK Parliament since 2019 by Feryal Clark of the Labour Party.

Constituency profile
The northernmost seat in Greater London, Enfield North is deeply suburban, almost village-like in parts, particularly its rolling terrain, including Gordon Hill and Carterhatch. Green belt legislation has kept housing development at bay, and the area has much in common with the adjoining county of Hertfordshire. The tree-lined avenues of Enfield Chase are also quiet and affluent. However, much of the eastern part of the constituency is in the Lea Valley industrial area, and includes some small areas with significant levels of multiple deprivation.

History
The seat was created for the February 1974 election from the former seats of Enfield West and Enfield East. The former was a safe Conservative seat, at one point represented by Iain Macleod, whereas the latter was a secure Labour seat.

From its creation up until 2015, Enfield North was somewhat a bellwether of the national result; it elected Labour MPs at both the 1974 elections, was taken by the Conservatives and held by comfortable margins in every election from 1979 to 1992, before being won back by Labour in 1997 (albeit with relatively narrow majorities throughout the party's time in government) and narrowly going to the Conservatives in 2010 in an election which nationally saw a hung Parliament. In 2015, however, the Conservatives lost the seat to Labour in an election which nationally saw them win an overall majority.

Boundary alterations based on an increased population within the existing area made the seat notionally Conservative before the 6 May 2010 election, and Nick de Bois won the seat. However, the former Labour MP Joan Ryan, who sat for the constituency from 1997 to 2010, regained it in 2015.  The 2015 result gave the seat the 13th most marginal majority of Labour's 232 seats by percentage of majority. De Bois and Ryan stood against each other in this seat over five general elections, between 2001 and 2017, with Ryan winning four of those five.

Boundaries

1974–1983: The London Borough of Enfield wards of Bullsmoor, Bush Hill, Cambridge Road, Chase, Enfield Wash, Green Street, Ordnance, Ponders End, Town, and Willow.

1983–2010: The London Borough of Enfield wards of Bullsmoor, Chase, Enfield Lock, Enfield Wash, Green Street, Hoe Lane, Ponders End, Southbury, Town, Willow, and Worcesters.

2010–present: The London Borough of Enfield wards of Chase, Enfield Highway, Enfield Lock, Highlands, Southbury, Town, and Turkey Street.

The constituency is set in the northern third of the London Borough of Enfield, stretching from Enfield Chase in the west, and the King George V Reservoir in the east, incorporating Brimsdown, Enfield Lock, and the M25 motorway interchange at the boundary with the borough of Broxbourne to the north.

Boundary review
Following its review of parliamentary representation in North London, the Boundary Commission for England made boundary changes to Enfield North for the 2010 general election. Part of Highlands ward was transferred to Enfield North from the constituency of Enfield, Southgate. Part of Grange ward was transferred to Enfield, Southgate. Ponders End ward was transferred to Edmonton, and part of Southbury ward was transferred from Edmonton to Enfield North.

Members of Parliament

Election results

Elections in the 2010s

Elections in the 2000s

Elections in the 1990s

Elections in the 1980s

Elections in the 1970s

See also
 List of parliamentary constituencies in London

Notes

References

External links 
Politics Resources (Election results from 1922 onwards)
Electoral Calculus (Election results from 1955 onwards)

Politics of the London Borough of Enfield
Parliamentary constituencies in London
Constituencies of the Parliament of the United Kingdom established in 1974